The Yunokawa Onsen (湯の川温泉) is a well known onsen in Japan on the northern island of Hokkaidō. It is located on the outskirts of Hakodate city close to Hakodate Airport.

History
In the Ainu language, the meaning of Yunokawa is a hot spring river.

This onsen is considered by Japanese to be one of the three major hot springs in Hokkaidō. Its origins are said to date back to 1653 when a lord of the Matsumae clan was healed of an incurable illness by bathing in its waters. Legend says that Seiryoin (清涼院), the 9th Lord of Matsumae Domain's mother, had him bathe for medical purposes in the Yunokawa Onsen in 1653. Having recovered from illness, and she had the Yakushido (薬師堂) rebuilt to honor his recovery and it was dedicated to Wniguchi (鰐口).

Water profile

The hot spring water contains various minerals including sodium, calcium chloride and sulphur.

Most of the slightly reddish hot spring water from this Onsen contains sodium, calcium, and chloride. It is believed the water can treat nerve and joint pains, fatigue, sprains, women’s diseases, among other health problems.

Features
In the nearby Hakodate city area there is a tropical botanical garden where a population of Japanese snow monkeys live. In colder months, the monkeys frequently use the hot springs on the garden grounds.

References

Hot springs of Hokkaido
Landforms of Hokkaido
Tourist attractions in Hakodate
Geothermal energy in Japan